The Cryptographic Message Syntax (CMS) is the IETF's standard for cryptographically protected messages. It can be used by cryptographic schemes and protocols to digitally sign, digest, authenticate or encrypt any form of digital data.

CMS is based on the syntax of PKCS #7, which in turn is based on the Privacy-Enhanced Mail standard.

The architecture of CMS is built around certificate-based key management, such as the profile defined by the PKIX working group.

CMS is used as the key cryptographic component of many other cryptographic standards, such as S/MIME, PKCS #12 and the  digital timestamping protocol.

OpenSSL is open source software that can encrypt, decrypt, sign and verify, compress and uncompress CMS documents.

See also

 CAdES - CMS Advanced Electronic Signatures
 S/MIME
 PKCS #7

External links
  (Update to the Cryptographic Message Syntax (CMS) for Algorithm Identifier Protection)
  (Cryptographic Message Syntax (CMS), in use)
  (Cryptographic Message Syntax (CMS), obsolete)
  (Cryptographic Message Syntax (CMS), obsolete)
  (Cryptographic Message Syntax, obsolete)
  (New ASN.1 Modules for Cryptographic Message Syntax (CMS) and S/MIME, in use)
  (New ASN.1 Modules for Cryptographic Message Syntax (CMS) and S/MIME, updated)
  (Using Elliptic Curve Cryptography with CMS, in use)
  (Use of Elliptic Curve Cryptography (ECC) Algorithms in Cryptographic Message Syntax (CMS), obsolete)
  (Using AES-CCM and AES-GCM Authenticated Encryption in the Cryptographic Message Syntax (CMS), in use)

Cryptographic protocols
Internet Standards